Annia may refer to:

 Annia gens, an ancient Roman clan
 Any Roman woman of the gens (see for list), including:
Paculla Annia, a priestess involved in the suppression of the Bacchanalia in 186 BC
 Via Annia, a Roman road in Cisalpine Gaul named for a member of the gens Annia
 Annia (insect), a disused synonym for a genus of praying mantises

See also
 Annius (disambiguation)
 Anna (disambiguation)
 Annaea gens
 Anneia